Danilho Raimundo Doekhi (born 30 June 1998) is a Dutch professional footballer who plays for German club Union Berlin as a centre back.

Club career
Doekhi was transferred to the AFC Ajax youth program in July 2016, but is a product of the Excelsior youth system. He made his Eredivisie debut with the latter on 6 March 2016 in a game against AZ. He replaced Stanley Elbers in the 81st minute, in a 2–0 away loss.

Doekhi made his Jupiler League-debut for Jong Ajax on 17 February 2017, coming on as an injury-time substitute for Léon Bergsma in the 95th minute against Achilles '29, with the game ending in a 3–2 away win.

Doekhi's first league start for Jong Ajax came in the first game of the new season, a 2–1 away win against SC Cambuur. It was followed up with two further starts against Fortuna Sittard and Jong PSV, before alternating between the bench and the starting line-up for much of September and October. After coming on as a sub against Go Ahead Eagles, Doekhi then entered a period of consistent starts for Jong Ajax, making 16 out of a possible 17 appearances in the starting line-up, lasting the full 90 minutes in 14 of them.

On 4 July 2018, Doekhi agreed to join fellow Eredivisie side, Vitesse on a four-year deal.

On 16 May 2022, Doekhi signed with German Bundesliga club Union Berlin.

Personal life
Born during the 1998 FIFA World Cup match between Argentina and England, his parents named him Raimundo after Brazilian International footballer Raimundo Souza Vieira de Oliveira. He is the nephew of former Dutch international football player Winston Bogarde and is of mixed Dutch and Surinamese descent.

Career statistics

Honours
Jong Ajax
 Eerste Divisie: 2017–18

References

External links
 

1998 births
Living people
Dutch sportspeople of Surinamese descent
Footballers from Rotterdam
Association football central defenders
Dutch footballers
Netherlands youth international footballers
XerxesDZB players
Excelsior Rotterdam players
Jong Ajax players
SBV Vitesse players
1. FC Union Berlin players
Eredivisie players
Eerste Divisie players
Dutch expatriate footballers
Expatriate footballers in Germany
Dutch expatriate sportspeople in Germany